The Kavirondo barb (Enteromius sexradiatus) is a species of cyprinid fish.

It is found only in Kenya.
Its natural habitat is freshwater lakes. Its status is insufficiently known.

Sources

Enteromius
Cyprinid fish of Africa
Taxa named by George Albert Boulenger
Fish described in 1911
Taxonomy articles created by Polbot